Enoch Jenkins (6 November 1892 – 4 January 1984) was a Welsh sports shooter. He competed for Great Britain at the 1920, 1924 and 1952 Summer Olympics.

References

External links
 

1892 births
1984 deaths
Welsh male sport shooters
Olympic shooters of Great Britain
Shooters at the 1920 Summer Olympics
Shooters at the 1924 Summer Olympics
Shooters at the 1952 Summer Olympics
Sportspeople from Pontypridd
British male sport shooters